Jeffery Ray Cornell (born February 10, 1957) is a retired Major League Baseball pitcher. He played during the  season at the major league level for the San Francisco Giants. He was drafted by the Kansas City Royals in the 8th round of the 1978 draft. Cornell played his first professional season with their Rookie League Gulf Coast League Royals in 1978. He was traded to the Giants in 1982. Cornell played his last season with the Chicago Cubs' Triple-A team, the Iowa Cubs, in 1986.

After the end of his playing career, Cornell became a scout for the Toronto Blue Jays, Milwaukee Brewers, and in 2008 for the Tampa Bay Rays, his current position.

Personal
Cornell has three kids Erin, Megan, and Jayce. His wife's name is Tammy.

Sources
"Jeff Cornell". Society for American Baseball Research. Retrieved on 2 March 2009.

External links
, or Retrosheet, or Pura Pelota

1957 births
Living people
Baseball players from Kansas City, Missouri
Gulf Coast Royals players
Iowa Cubs players
Jacksonville Suns players
Major League Baseball pitchers
Milwaukee Brewers scouts
Missouri Tigers baseball players
Ole Miss Rebels baseball players
Phoenix Giants players
Pittsfield Cubs players
San Francisco Giants players
Shreveport Captains players
Tampa Bay Rays scouts
Tigres de Aragua players
American expatriate baseball players in Venezuela
Toronto Blue Jays scouts
Alaska Goldpanners of Fairbanks players